To the End may refer to:

 "To the End" (Blur song), a 1994 song by the rock band Blur
 To the End (film), 2022 film
 "To the End" (My Chemical Romance song), a song by the rock band My Chemical Romance
 "To the End" (Yohio song), 2014 song by Yohio